Songs from an American Movie Vol. Two: Good Time for a Bad Attitude is the fifth studio album by Everclear, released on November 21, 2000. They recorded Vol. One and Vol. Two in the same year and released them only a few months apart.  Both albums are loose concept albums inspired by Art Alexakis' second divorce. The first one is more pop-based and melodic, the second angrier with a more punk/hard rock sound. It also focuses more on the destruction of relationships in its lyrical content.

The album debuted at #66 on the Billboard charts, a disappointment compared to Vol. One's top-ten debut. Furthermore, it does not have a certification from the RIAA, while Vol. One was certified Platinum. However, Vol. Two was certified Gold in Canada in February 2001. None of the singles received any significant airplay on radio or MTV.
 
"When It All Goes Wrong Again", "Out of My Depth," and "Rock Star" were released as singles from this album. "When It All Goes Wrong Again" was featured on the soundtrack for the 2001 film Antitrust starring Ryan Phillippe while "Rock Star" was featured for the 2001 film of the same name starring Mark Wahlberg.

Track listing 
 All songs written by Art Alexakis, Craig Montoya and Greg Eklund

Personnel 
Band
 Art Alexakis - Guitar, Vocals
 Craig Montoya - Bass
 Greg Eklund - drums

Production
 Stephen Marcussen - Mastering
 Dan Marnien - Engineer
 Frank Ockenfels  Photography
 Lars Fox - Producer, Engineer, Digital Engineer, Loop, Loops, Computers
 Mauricio Iragorri - Mixing
 Jeffery Fey - Coordination, Layout Design, Layout Coordinator
 Sean Cox - Guitar Technician
 Darren Lewis - Executive Producer, Management
 Perry Watts-Russell - Executive Producer, A&R
 David Weiss - Management
 Geoff Walcha - Assistant Engineer, Vocal Engineer, Guitar Engineer
 Scott Warner - Lighting Design
 David Weise - Management
 Andy Banton - Live Sound
 James Beaton - Keyboards
 Brett Snyder - Drum Technician
 Matt Miley - Management .
 Neal Avron - Engineer, Vocal Recording, Mixing
 Bradley Cook - Engineer, Drum Recordings
 Kevin Dean - Assistant Engineer, Drum Engineering, Bass Engineer
 Mick Kent - Engineer, Live Sound Engineer, Production Coordination, Product Manager

References 

2000 albums
Everclear (band) albums
Concept albums
Sequel albums
Albums produced by Art Alexakis